Francis Gibson may refer to:

 Francis Gibson (writer) (1753–1805), English writer and occasional painter
 Francis Gibson (banker) (1805–1858), British banker and businessman
 Francis Gibson (politician), member of the Utah House of Representatives

See also
 Frank Gibson (disambiguation)